A 1954 Convention travel document is a travel document, unlike a Stateless travel document (stateless person by a signatory to the 1954 Convention Relating to the Status of Stateless Persons), issued to a person in circumstances of any difficulties in gaining a travel document from their country of origin. The cover bears the words travel document in English and French (and often in the language of the issuing state) along with the date of the convention, but does not bear the two stripes appearing in the upper right corner of the front cover of refugee travel documents. However, some countries such as Australia and Japan issues stateless persons travel documents with other names such as Certificate of Identity or Re-entry Permit, etc., regardless of whether the country is a contracting state of 1954 Convention.

See also
Refugee identity certificate
Travel document
Passport
Refugee travel document
Certificate of identity

References

International travel documents
Statelessness